Andraca is a genus of moths of the family Endromidae.

The genus had been placed in the family Bombycidae for over 150 years, but was recently transferred to family Endromidae based on the molecular study of Zwick et al. in 2011.

Species
Subgenus Andraca
Andraca bipunctata Walker, 1865
Andraca draco Zolotuhin, 2012
Andraca lawa Zolotuhin, 2012
Andraca stueningi Zolotuhin & Witt, 2009
Andraca trilochoides Moore, 1865
Andraca trilochoides roepkei Bryk, 1944
Andraca trilochoides trilochoides Moore, 1865
Subgenus Crypathemola Zolotuhin, 2012
Andraca apodecta Swinhoe, 1907
Andraca chrysocollis Zolotuhin, 2012
Andraca melli Zolotuhin & Witt, 2009
Andraca nobilorum Zolotuhin, 2012
Andraca olivacea Matsumura, 1927
Andraca olivacea olivacea Matsumura, 1927
Andraca olivacea olivacens Mell, 1958
Andraca paradisea Zolotuhin, 2012
Andraca theae Matsumura, 1909
Subgenus unknown
Andraca flavamaculata (Yang, 1995)
Andraca gongshanensis Wang, Zeng & Wang, 2011

Former species
Andraca angulata Kishida, 1993

References

 
Macrolepidoptera genera